The Espace 1100 (English: Space) is a French sailboat that was designed by Philippe Briand as a cruiser and first built in 1985. The boat is one of the Espace series of cruising sailboats and its designation indicates its approximate length overall in centimeters.

Production
The design was built by Jeanneau in France, from 1985 until 1989.

Design
The Espace 1100 is a recreational keelboat, built predominantly of fiberglass, with wood trim. It has a masthead sloop rig, with aluminum spars with stainless steel wire rigging. The hull has a raked stem, a reverse transom with a swimming platform, a skeg-mounted rudder controlled by two wheels, one in the cockpit and one in the wheelhouse. It has a fixed fin keel or optional keel and centerboard. The fin keel version displaces  and carries  of ballast, while the centerboard-equipped version displaces .

The boat is fitted with a British Perkins Engines 4-154 diesel engine for docking and maneuvering.

The design has sleeping accommodation for six people, with a double "V"-berth in the bow cabin, double settee port amidships and an aft cabin with a double berth on the starboard side. The galley is located on the starboard amidships. The galley is equipped with a two-burner stove, ice box and a double sink. A navigation station is opposite the galley, centered above, in the wheelhouse next to the salon. The head is located just aft of the bow cabin on the port side and includes a shower.

For sailing downwind the design may be equipped with a symmetrical spinnaker.

See also
List of sailing boat types

References

External links

 Espace 1100 interior tour

Keelboats
1980s sailboat type designs
Sailing yachts
Sailboat type designs by Philippe Briand
Sailboat types built by Jeanneau